Stephen Gerard Boyd (born August 22, 1972) is a former American football linebacker who played in the National Football League. He was a two time Pro Bowl selection at middle linebacker for the Detroit Lions. He was selected in the fifth round of the 1995 NFL Draft out of Boston College, the 141st selection, where he started for four seasons.

Early years
Boyd played his high school football for Valley Stream Central High School (Valley Stream, NY) for Coach Dan Tronolone, where he led the Eagles to the 1989 Nassau County Conference II Championship. A two-year captain, Boyd was selected as a Daily News All-Star his junior year after recording 102 tackles and three fumble recoveries. Boyd tabbed 92 tackles, three fumble recoveries, three interceptions and a blocked punt as a senior. He also contributed 576 yards on 104 carries with 14 touchdowns as a fullback and added 9 PATs. He was selected as the Daily News Metropolitan Player of the Year and selected to the All-Suburbun football team. He was the winner of the Thorpe Award which goes to the best football player in Nassau County. 

Boyd chose to play at Boston College after entertaining over two dozen offers including Wake Forest, Notre Dame, and Maryland. Boyd earned a starting role as a redshirt freshman in the 1991 season where he totaled 100 tackles. As a sophomore Boyd earned 2nd team All-Big East honors. During the 1993 campaign, Boyd led the Big East in tackles with 161 and was selected 1st team All-Big East. In 1994, he was elected the ECAC Player of the Year. As a senior at Boston College, he was invited to play in the 1994 East-West Shrine Game where he recorded an interception and the 1994 Hula Bowl.

Professional career

Boyd was selected141 overall in the 1995 NFL Draft by the Detroit Lions.

1995
As a rookie in the NFL, he backed up legendary All-Pro middle linebacker Chris Spielman.

1996

1997
When Spielman left the Lions for the Buffalo Bills in 1996, Boyd became the starter and an integral part of the defense for the next six seasons. In 1997, Boyd paced the Lions with 192 tackles leading Detroit to the NFC Wild Card game for the second time in three seasons. He was named the NFC Defensive Player of the Week (8/31) in the season opener when he scored his first career touchdown on a 42-yard fumble recovery, and set up the game winning TD with his first career interception. He also led the team with 15 tackles that game.

1998
In 1998, Boyd led the Lions with 156 tackles, despite missing the last three games of the season with a shoulder injury. He was named the NFC Player of the Month for November when he compiled 56 tackles and two sacks in four games. He was named the first alternate at middle linebacker on the NFC's Pro Bowl squad, and would have played in the game if he had not been recovering from a shoulder injury.

1999
In 1999, Boyd led the team in tackles for the third straight season with 128. He was also named to the All-Madden team for the first time in his career. In a Wild Card loss to the Washington Redskins Boyd recorded 18 tackles and returned his first post-season interception for five yards. He was also named to his first Pro Bowl as a starter for the NFC as middle linebacker.

2000
In 2000, Boyd led the Lions for the fourth consecutive year with 139 tackles. He recorded 10 double-digit tackle outings in the 15 games that he played. He was named to his second consecutive Associated Press Pro Bowl, and was also named All-Pro Second Team and All-NFC for second straight season by Football News.

2001
Boyd retired in May 2002 after playing in only 4 games in the 2001 season due to chronic back pain.

NFL statistics

Post-playing career
He currently resides in Long Beach, New York and was the head coach of Chaminade High School football in Mineola, New York before retiring in 2016.  He continues to work at Chaminade part-time.

References

1972 births
Living people
Valley Stream Central High School alumni
American football linebackers
Boston College Eagles football players
Detroit Lions players
National Conference Pro Bowl players
High school football coaches in New York (state)